Frédéric Dambier (born 26 December 1977) is a French figure skater. He is a four-time French national silver medalist and competed at two Olympic Games. He twice placed fourth at the European Figure Skating Championships. He is the first French skater to land a quadruple salchow in competition.

Career 
Dambier started skating when he was about six or seven years old when a neighbor took him to the small ice rink of Joué les Tours. In practice, he landed his first triple jump, the salchow, at 14, and his first quad salchow when he was 19. He became the first French skater to perform the quad salchow in competition when he landed it at the 1999 Ondrej Nepela Memorial.

Dambier was coached by Annick Gailhaguet, Pierre Trente, Diana Skotnicka and Li Ping, and his choreographers included Olga Leonovich, Shanti Rushpaul and Alexander Zhulin from 2003 to 2006. After retiring from competitive skating in August 2006, Dambier participated in numerous ice shows including Holiday on Ice, Generali on Ice and Les Étoiles de la Glace. He also coached in the clubs of Cape Town in South Africa in 2007.

From 2008 to 2010, Dambier was Sport Director of Cité Internationale Universitaire de Paris. 

From 2010 to 2013, he worked now for the INSEP (National Institute of Sport) and is a member of the Board of the ASPC (Association of Sport Performance Centres). He is a figure skating consultant for the French channel Ma Chaîne Sport and worked as a choreograph for Charles Tetar from 2008 to 2010.

From 2013 to 2020, he worked for the French Federation of Ice Sports as deputy technical manager before working for the French Ministry of Sports.

Personal life 
He studied at the Centre for Law and Economics of Sport in Limoges and obtained a Master of Law Economics Sports.

Programs

Results 

GP: Grand Prix

References

External links 

 
 Official site of Frédéric Dambier

French male single skaters
Olympic figure skaters of France
Figure skaters at the 2006 Winter Olympics
Figure skaters at the 2002 Winter Olympics
1977 births
Living people
Sportspeople from Tours, France
Competitors at the 1997 Winter Universiade
Competitors at the 1999 Winter Universiade